Trichogaster fasciata, the banded gourami or striped gourami or Colisa or Kholshe , is a tropical labyrinth perch found in some Asian countries  like Bangladesh, Eastern India, Northeastern India, Nepal, Upper Myanmar, China and Pakistan.

Characteristics
Trichogaster fasciata is an air-breathing fish, so that the aerial respiration is performed with the help of a pair of supra-branchial chambers, each containing a complicated labyrinthine organ. Body is elongated and compressed. Mouth is small and slightly protrusible. Preorbital serrate is found in young fish. Body color is greenish with oblique orange or bluish bars descending downwards and backwards from the back to the anal fin. It is benthopelagic and prefers weedy environments such as estuaries, ponds, large rivers, ditches, lakes and rice fields. The species has drawn attention for its scrumptious taste, contribution to nutrition and its ornamental value as an aquarium fish. It is somewhat shy but quite hardy, and easily adapts to life in community aquarium. It is also easy to breed in captivity. Banded gourami is being exported to Germany, Hong Kong, Japan, Malaysia, Republic of Korea, Singapore, Taiwan, Thailand and USA due to their distinctive color. In the past, the species was readily available in freshwater pools, ponds, ditches, marshes, rivers, lakes with vegetation, but the natural resources of this fish are declining fast due to various anthropogenic stressors.

Feeding habit
The mouth of this species is bordered by thick lips, the upper being protrudable and more pronounced in the male. Small and feeble teeth are present in the mouth and buccal cavity. The intestine is long and coiled. The fish is omnivorous in nature, so they can feed on live, frozen and flake feeds.

Sexual dimorphism
Males are much more colourful than females, and develop pointed dorsal and anal fins when they are mature.

Reproduction
The total life span of this species is approximately 4 years. Banded gourami has three distinctive life stages: pre-spawning (January–March), spawning (April–August) and post-spawning (September–December). They become sexually mature at 1 year of age with the total length of male and female reached approximately at 10 cm and 6–8 cm, respectively. Generally males are slightly larger in size than their females. Male and female broods are distinguished by examining the gonads and based on the external morphological features: the upper lip of the male is more pronounced and the dorsal ventral fins are more pointed at the posterior end than those of the female. Like other Anabantoids, this species is a bubble nest builder and the fertilization is external.

Relationship with humans
Before being introduced into the aquarium trade, the dwarf, along with the snakeskin gourami was and still is a popular food fish in its native range. In Bangladesh it is known as “Kholisha” and “”Khosti” in India and “Kungee” in Punjab as well as different linguistic variants within its range.

Taxonomy
Trichogaster fasciata was formally described in 1801 by Marcus Elieser Bloch and Johann Gottlob Schneider with the type locality given as Tranquebar, a Danish trading post in India. It is the type species of the genus Trichogaster.

References

fasciata
Fish of South Asia
Fish described in 1801
Taxa named by Marcus Elieser Bloch
Taxa named by Johann Gottlob Theaenus Schneider